Time is the first solo album by American musician Richard Carpenter. Dionne Warwick, Dusty Springfield and Scott Grimes sang on the album, on the songs "In Love Alone", "Something in Your Eyes", and "That's What I Believe", respectively. The song "When Time Was All We Had" is dedicated to Richard's sister, Karen. It was later included on the 3-CD compilation The Ultimate Collection.

Track listing
"Say Yeah!" (Richard Carpenter, Paul Janz, Pamela Phillips Oland) – 3:51
"Who Do You Love?" (Mark Holden, Peter Hamilton, Gary Pickus) – 3:15
"Something in Your Eyes" (Richard Carpenter, Barry Mann, Cynthia Weil, Pamela Phillips Oland) – 4:13
"When Time Was All We Had" (a dedication to Karen) (Richard Carpenter, Pamela Phillips Oland) – 3:03
"Time" (Richard Carpenter, Dave Clark) – 3:34
"Calling Your Name Again" (Richard Carpenter, Richard Marx) – 4:19
"In Love Alone" (Richard Carpenter, John Bettis) – 3:22
"Remind Me to Tell You" (Richard Carpenter, Mark Mueller) – 3:54
"That's What I Believe" (Richard Carpenter, Dean Pitchford, Scott Grimes, Pamela Phillips Oland) – 4:28
"I'm Still Not Over You" (Richard Carpenter, Alain Boublil, Richard Maltby Jr.) – 5:51

Personnel
Richard Carpenter - lead vocals (tracks: 1, 2, 4, 6, 8, 10), keyboards, backing vocals, arrangements
Dusty Springfield - lead vocals on "Something in Your Eyes"
Dionne Warwick - lead vocals on "In Love Alone"
Scott Grimes - lead and backing vocals on "That's What I Believe"
Tim May - guitar
Tony Peluso - lead guitar (tracks: 2, 3, 6, 10)
Joe Osborn - bass guitar
Bill Lanphier - bass guitar (track: 9)
Paul Leim - drums
Paulinho Da Costa - percussion (tracks: 3, 5, 8)
Herb Alpert - flugelhorn solo on "When Time Was All We Had"
John Phillips - alto saxophone on "That's What I Believe"
Jim Cox - synthesizer programming
James Getzoff - concertmaster
Technical
Michael Bowman, Rob Jacobs, Robert de la Garza - engineer
Roger Young - recording, mixing
Chuck Beeson - art direction
Larry Williams - photography

Singles
"Something in Your Eyes" (featuring Dusty Springfield)
US 7" single (1987) – A&M 2940
"Something in Your Eyes"
"Time"

JP 7" promo (1987) – 5Y3056
"Something in Your Eyes"
"Time"

AU 7" single (1987) – K289
"Something in Your Eyes"
"Time"

"Who Do You Love?"
JP 7" promo (1987) – 7Y3076
"Who Do You Love?"
"When Time Was All We Had"

"Time"
US 7" promo (1988) – A&M 2998
"Time"
"Calling Your Name Again"

1987 debut albums
A&M Records albums
Richard Carpenter (musician) albums